The A.E. Seaman Mineral Museum, currently located on the campus of Michigan Technological University in Houghton, Michigan, is the official mineral museum of the state of Michigan and is a heritage site of the Keweenaw National Historical Park. The museum is named for professor Arthur Edmund Seaman, who worked at Michigan Tech in the late 19th and early 20th centuries, and was the museum's curator from 1928 until 1937.

The mineral collection was established in the 19th century, and by 1890 numbered 27,000 specimens. The museum currently houses over 25,000 specimens from around the world. Many of these specimens are native generally to Michigan, and more specifically to the Lake Superior region.

History

The mineral museum first became a reality in 1902, when it was set up in the former Qualitative Laboratory room in Hubbell Hall on Michigan Tech's campus. In 1908, a separate building (which would later become Tech's Administration Building) was constructed for the museum. The museum fully occupied the second floor of the building. In 1931, the museum was moved to Hotchkiss Hall. The museum was renamed the A. E. Seaman Mineral Museum in 1932.

On June 17, 1976 the museum moved to the fifth floor of the Electrical Energy Resource Center at Michigan Tech, built on the site of Hotchkiss Hall. The museum was designated the "official Mineralogical Museum of Michigan" in 1990 by the Michigan Legislature.

In 2005, Michigan Tech purchased the blacksmith shop and machine shop buildings at the Quincy Mine site, with the intent of moving the museum there. The roof of the machine shop was replaced, but Tech decided instead to build a new building, and sold the buildings back to the Quincy Mine Hoist Association. In 2011, the museum moved to the new Thomas D Shaffner Hall, across from the Advanced Technology Development Complex. It is named for Thomas Shaffner, a Michigan Tech alumnus who donated $1 million for the new museum.

Curators
 Arthur Edmund Seaman (1928–1937)
 Kiril Spiroff (1938–1943, 1964–1975)
 Wyllis Seaman (1943–1948)
 Jean Peterman Kemp (1975–1986)
 Stanley J Dyl II (1986–1996)
 George Willard Robinson (1996–2013)
 John A. Jaszczak (interim 2013)
 Christopher J. Stefano (2013–2019)
 Theodore J. Bornhorst (interim 2019–2020)
 John A. Jaszczak (2020-present)
Source:

Publications

References

External links

Official webpage
Society of Mineral Museum Professionals (SMMP)

Seaman
Michigan Technological University
Seaman
Seaman Mineral
Seaman Mineral
Seaman Mineral
Seaman Mineral
Museums established in 1902
1902 establishments in Michigan
Seaman Mineral